Nicholas Dametto (born 18 September 1983) is an Australian politician. He has been the Katter's Australian Party member for Hinchinbrook in the Queensland Legislative Assembly since 2017. Dametto finished third on the primary vote, behind the Liberal National Party and One Nation. However, he overtook One Nation for second place on Labor preferences, and then defeated LNP incumbent Andrew Cripps on One Nation preferences. Hinchinbrook had been in the hands of the LNP or the Nationals since 1960.

Dametto was born in Ingham, and has worked within several industries, namely tourism as the previous owner of jet ski operator Townsville Watersports, sugar at the Victorian Mill and mining as a diesel fitter and boilermaker nationwide.

References

Parliamentary Profile

1983 births
Living people
Members of the Queensland Legislative Assembly
Katter's Australian Party politicians
21st-century Australian politicians